Zhongyang usually refers to something related to the central government of China, It especially can refer to: 

 National Central University, known as Guólì Zhōngyāng Dàxué, founded in Nanjing and now located in Zhongli
 Central Committee of the Communist Party of China (中国共产党中央委员会), abbreviated zhongyang (中央)
 Central Daily News (中央日報), once the official newspaper of the Kuomintang  
 Academia Sinica, or Zhongyang Yanjiuyuan (中央硏究院), the National Academy of the ROC (Taiwan)

See also
 Zhongyang County (中阳), in Shanxi province
 Chongyang (disambiguation)
 Chūō (disambiguation)